Chester St Oswalds F.C. were a football club based in Chester, England.

History
The club was formed by Mr L Bebbington as some point in the 1870s.

A Special General Meeting in July 1887 lists the club captain as John Thompson, with vice captain Tom Pixton, and Mr Bennion as reserve captain. Prior to this John Boardman had been captain for two seasons. The club had just moved to Exton Park, and had adopted blue and white vertical stripes as the club colours.

The club's Annual Meeting of May 1888 stated the club had a field in Exton Park especially levelled and enclosed for next year.

In 1889 Francis Jayne the Bishop of Chester became patron of the club and contributed towards it financially.

The club competed in the 1889-90 FA Cup, losing 3–0 against Chester FC.

The club was dissolved on 26 January 1892.

The St Oswalds name was revived in June 1898 when Chester P.S.A. changed their name.

League history

Cup history

Honours

League

Cups

Chester Charity Cup
Winners (1): 1891

Notable players
 Charlie Parry - Wales International, later played for Everton.

References

Defunct football clubs in Cheshire
Defunct football clubs in England
Sport in Chester
Association football clubs disestablished in 1892
Association football clubs established in the 19th century
West Cheshire Association Football League clubs